Konaki-jiji (子泣き爺, Konaki-Jijī, translated into Old man crying) is a kind of Japanese yōkai, a supernatural spirit in Japanese folklore. It is similar to the Scandinavian myling and the Slavic poroniec.

Description
The Konaki-jiji is said to be able to take the appearance of an old man or a baby. In either case, the spirit lures an unwary passerby towards it and allows him or her to pick it up. After the spirit is picked up, it suddenly becomes a heavy stone that crushes the victim to death. In some versions of Konaki-jiji stories, the spirit is that of a baby left to die in the wilderness.

The Konaki-jiji can be traced back to family records in Shikoku where the term was used to describe an old man who sounded like a child when he cried. The term was eventually used in a national encyclopedia of yōkai and became a nationally known phenomenon.

References

Japanese folklore
Yōkai